Shawn Clark (born August 16, 1975) is an American football coach who is the head football coach at Appalachian State University. He had been an assistant with the program since 2016, and was promoted to head coach following the departure of Eliah Drinkwitz.

Clark has cited the "culture, traditions, and family" of Appalachian State football being its greatest characteristics, and it is hoped that Clark will bring back some Jerry Moore-esque stability to a program that had lost Scott Satterfield to Louisville and Drinkwitz to Missouri in consecutive years, 2018 and 2019, as those coaches used successful tenures at Appalachian as stepping stones into "power conference" programs. In a nod to the Boone legend, Clark said at his introductory press conference there will always be a place for Jerry Moore at the Appalachian State football program as long as Clark is the coach.

Playing career
An offensive lineman in college, Clark was a two-time All-American (1996 and 1998) and three-time all-conference selection (1995, 1996, 1998) for teams that went a combined 45-16 during his first five years in Boone. In fact, as a player during the 12-0 start in 1995 and a coach for the 2019 team that has set a single-season record for wins by an FBS program in the state of North Carolina, Clark has been part of the two App State teams to post 11 regular-season victories.

Clark graduated from App State with a bachelor's degree in criminal justice in 1998 and earned a master's degree in education from Louisville in 2003.

Coaching career
Clark joined the Appalachian staff as offensive line coach in 2016 under head coach Scott Satterfield, then becoming an assistant head coach in 2019. Upon the departure of Eliah Drinkwitz for Missouri, Clark became the 22nd head coach in program history on December 13, 2019. Clark led the Mountaineers in their bowl game that year to a 31–17 victory over UAB Blazers in the New Orleans Bowl. Clark's first full season as head coach of the Mountaineers was met with complications from the COVID-19 pandemic, which caused many changes to schedules and football operations around the country. The team persevered and Clark finished 9–3 and lead the team in the inaugural Myrtle Beach Bowl and defeated the North Texas Mean Green with a dominating 56–28 performance.

Head coaching record

References

External links
 Appalachian State profile

1975 births
Living people
American football offensive linemen
Appalachian State Mountaineers football coaches
Appalachian State Mountaineers football players
Coaches of American football from West Virginia
Eastern Kentucky Colonels football coaches
George Washington High School (Charleston, West Virginia) alumni
Louisville Cardinals football coaches
Kent State Golden Flashes football coaches
Purdue Boilermakers football coaches
Players of American football from West Virginia
Sportspeople from Charleston, West Virginia